Stoke Park is a  park on the edge of the town centre of Guildford, Surrey, England donated to Guildford by the Lord Onslow in 1925 with the express wish that it "remain for all time a lung of the town". Between London Road and Parkway, two of the four arterial roads to the A3, Stoke Park is the largest park within the town signed area of Guildford. It is also a Green Flag award winning park. The park and its woodland have remained more or less intact since they were laid out in the 18th-century. Then, there was the manor house which owned slightly more land remaining from the manor of Stoke-next-Guildford, complete with walled garden and icehouse.

Geography
To the west of the park is Guildford College. The other side of the college, away from the park, is St John's Church. To the south of the park is Guildford Community Church, Guildford High School and London Road (Guildford) railway station. Surrounding the park to the south and east is the A3100 road. This meets the A25 road, which runs along the north side of the park, in the northeast corner close to the Guildfordian Bisons RFC pitches. To the north of the A25 road is the Guildford Spectrum with which the park shares its facilities.

History
Stoke was originally a parish south of the River Wey. In 1894, it became part of Guildford, when the parish of Stoke was split into two, Stoke-within-Guildford and Stoke-next-Guildford. Before 1762, the site of Stoke Park was called the Paddocks, it was owned by a Mr Dyson who laid out its dimensions. In 1780, it was purchased by a Mr Aldesey. He bought it along with Stoke Mills. The road that later became the A320 Stoke Road/Woking Road was diverted in 1780 to the west end of St. John's Church in Stoke away from Stoke Park. It runs north to south, to the west of the ornamental gardens and the model boating lake in the park. In 1879 Samuel Budgett bought 100 acres of the estate, along with the mansion for £35,000, from Lord Onslow.

Sport
It was home for many years to the Old Guilfordians RFC before their merger with Guildford and Godalming RFC to form Guildford Rugby Club in 2003. Following this, the junior rugby section of the club stayed at Stoke Park under the name of Guildfordians Rugby. They were joined in 2002, by disaffected Old Guildfordians, who had gone to Guildford and Godalming, thus forming Stoke Park Bisons RFC. At the beginning of the 2008–09 Season the RFU allowed the club to become named Guildfordian Bisons RFC, thus forming a link between both the senior and junior sides.

The Guildford Crows Aussie Rules FC train at Stoke Park during the summer.

Facilities
Stoke Park contains sports pitches, tennis courts, woodland areas, formal gardens, climbing frames, a water cascade, an outdoor ‘trim trail’, crazy golf course, children's play area with slides, a paddling and model boating pool, concrete skatepark and other large expanses of grass.

Events
Stoke Park is home to the annual Surrey County Show held during the second bank holiday weekend in May and a number of other events throughout the year such as the Race for Life and the Surrey County Agricultural Show.

Stoke Park was the site of the annual music festival GuilFest, and it holds the annual Guildford Lions Firework Fiesta on 5 November every year. The event includes many fairground attractions and food stands and starts with a torch lit procession from Guildford High Street and ends with a 20-minute firework finale.

A 5 km run against the clock is organised by the group Parkrun most Saturday mornings.

References

External links

Green Flag Award winners – Stoke Park, Guildford

Sports venues in Guildford
Parks and open spaces in Surrey